Robert Burnett Miller (September 2, 1923 – October 14, 2018) was an American politician who served as Mayor of Sacramento, California in 1982.

Biography
Miller was born on September 2, 1923, in Sacramento, California where his father was in the lumber business. He joined the ROTC at Santa Clara College in 1941. He fought in the Battle of the Bulge and was with the U.S. 11th Armored Division when it liberated the Mauthausen concentration camp in Austria on May 6, 1945. The final episode of Ken Burns' documentary The War features Miller's harrowing eyewitness account of encountering the Holocaust at Mauthausen.

Miller served on the Sacramento City Council from 1971 to 1977. He then served as mayor of Sacramento, California in 1982. Miller died at his home on October 14, 2018, at the age of 95.

References

1923 births
2018 deaths
United States Army personnel of World War II
Mayors of Sacramento, California
Sacramento City Council members
Military personnel from California
Santa Clara University alumni
United States Army soldiers